Jamtara is a census town in the Dumri CD block in the Dumri subdivision of  the Giridih district in the Indian state of Jharkhand.

Geography

Location                                 

Area overview
Giridih district is a part of the Chota Nagpur plateau, with rocky soil and extensive forests. Most of the rivers in the district flow from the west to east, except in the northern portion where the rivers flow north and north west. The district has coal and mica mines. It is an overwhelmingly rural district with small pockets of urbanisation.

Note: The map alongside presents some of the notable locations in the district. All places marked in the map are linked in the larger full screen map.

Demographics
According to the 2011 Census of India, Jamtara had a total population of 6,255, of which 3,249 (52%) were males and 3,006 (48%) were females. Population in the age range 0–6 years was 949. The total number of literate persons in Jamtara was 3,906 (73.61% of the population over 6 years).

Infrastructure
According to the District Census Handbook 2011, Giridih, Jamtara covered an area of 4.54 km2. Among the civic amenities, it had 48 km roads with open drains, the protected water supply involved uncovered well, hand pump. It had 879 domestic electric connections, 15 road light points. Among the educational facilities it had 6 primary schools, 3 middle schools, 2 secondary schools, 2 senior secondary schools, 1 general degree college. It had 9 non-formal education centres (Sarva Siksha Abhiyan). Among the social, recreational and cultural facilities it had 1 stadium, 1 cinema theatre, 1 auditorium/ community hall, 1 public library, reading room. Two important commodities it produced were bamboo baskets, muri. It had the branch offices of 1 nationalised bank, 1 cooperative bank.

References

Cities and towns in Giridih district